Golo Brdo is a village in the municipality of Bijeljina, Bosnia and Herzegovina.  As of 2013 it has a population of 392.

Demography

Nationalities

References

Populated places in Bijeljina